Xanthorrhoea johnsonii (also known as Johnson's Grass Tree) is a large plant in the genus Xanthorrhoea found in eastern Australia. The trunk can grow to 5 metres tall. Older foliage is very strong, hence one of the common names being "steel grass", and is commonly used in floral design where it can be bent and looped without breaking.

It was named after the Australian botanist L.A.S. Johnson.

References

Flora of New South Wales
Flora of Queensland
johnsonii